Stinking Creek is a stream in northern Polk County in the U.S. state of Missouri. It is a tributary of the Pomme de Terre River. The stream headwaters are along Missouri Route D between Polk and Huron. The stream flows north-northwest and enters the southern end of Pomme de Terre Lake just west of Adonis.

Stinking Creek was so named on account of the naturally occurring stench it produces.

See also
List of rivers of Missouri

References

Rivers of Polk County, Missouri
Rivers of Missouri